Norman Proctor (11 May 1896–1947) was an English footballer who played in the Football League for Halifax Town, Leicester City, Rotherham County, Tranmere Rovers and West Ham United.

References

1896 births
1947 deaths
English footballers
Association football forwards
English Football League players
Blyth Spartans A.F.C. players
Rotherham County F.C. players
West Ham United F.C. players
Leicester City F.C. players
Tranmere Rovers F.C. players
Halifax Town A.F.C. players
Workington A.F.C. players